Itá may refer to:

Itá, Paraguay, a Paraguayan city
Itá, Santa Catarina, a Brazilian municipality
Itá Dam, on the Uruguay River in Brazil
Itá Hydroelectric Power Plant, on the Uruguay River in Brazil